

Election Results

References

1995 Virginia elections